Neft Theater is an alternative independent theater based in Kharkiv since 2018. "Neft" is an open theatrical platform, where there is no fixed troupe and classical canons. Actors, directors, musicians, choreographers, and artists can share their ideas at "Neft," gather a team and implement a new theater project.

References

External link 
Official website

Theatres in Ukraine
Culture in Kharkiv
Buildings and structures in Kharkiv
Buildings and structures in Kharkiv Oblast
Tourist attractions in Kharkiv
Tourist attractions in Kharkiv Oblast